Stone Age in America is an 1887 bronze statue by John J. Boyle located in Philadelphia, in Fairmount Park on Kelly Drive near Boathouse Row.

It was displayed at the American Art Association, and in 1888 was exhibited in Philadelphia where it was temporarily shown at 9th and Chestnut streets. It was exhibited at the 1893 World's Columbian Exposition.

Stone Age in America is one of 51 sculptures included in the Association for Public Art's Museum Without Walls: AUDIO™ interpretive audio program for Philadelphia's outdoor sculpture.

The inscription reads:
Boyle
Thiebaut. Freres
Fondeurs 
(Base, circular bronze plaque:) 
Fairmount Park Art Association
Presented 1888

See also
 List of public art in Philadelphia

References

External links
http://www.joeyablonsky.com/stoneage.htm
http://www.visitphilly.com/music-art/philadelphia/stone-age-in-america/
http://exhibit.juncanoo.com/p/tour-3--boathouse-row-and-kelly-drive/26--stone-age-in-america--1887-/

Outdoor sculptures in Philadelphia
1887 sculptures
Bronze sculptures in Pennsylvania
East Fairmount Park
Statues in Pennsylvania
Sculptures of women in Pennsylvania
1887 establishments in Pennsylvania
Sculptures of bears
Sculptures of Native Americans
Sculptures of children in the United States